Coleophora altivagella is a moth of the family Coleophoridae. It is found in France, Italy and Austria.

References

altivagella
Moths described in 1952
Moths of Europe